Susan Morgan may refer to:

 Susan Morgan (author) (20 July 1957), English author of chick-lit genre
 Susan Morgan (politician) (born 1990), American Republican politician in the state of Oregon

See also
 Susan Morgan Leveille (born 1949), weaver and teacher from Dillsboro, North Carolina